Carrel is a surname. Notable people with the surname include:

Armand Carrel (1800–1836), French writer
Alexis Carrel (1873–1944), French surgeon and biologist
Dany Carrel (born 1932), French actress
Félicité Carrel, Italian mountaineer
Frank Carrel (1870–1940), Canadian journalist, publisher and politician
Gabriella Carrel (born 1966), Italian cross-country skier
Jean-Antoine Carrel (1829–1890), Italian mountain climber
Luigi Carrel (1901–1983), Italian mountain climber

See also 

Carrel (crater), lunar crater named after Alexis Carrel
Carrel desk, small high-sided desk
Carel
Carell
Carril, surname
Carrell

French-language surnames
Surnames from given names